Harpalus italus is a species of ground beetle in the subfamily Harpalinae. It was described by Schaum in 1860.

References

italus
Beetles described in 1860